The organs of Chichester Cathedral are the major source of instrumental music at the cathedral, being played for daily services and accompanying the choir, as well as being used for concerts and recitals. There has been organ music at Chichester Cathedral almost continuously since the medieval period, with a break in the mid-17th century during the Commonwealth period.

There are now five pipe organs at Chichester Cathedral, with pipes of the main organ dating to the Restoration, the Hurdis Organ to the late 18th century and the three most recent organs dating to the late 20th century.

The earliest recorded Organist of Chichester Cathedral is William Campion in 1543, and the earliest recorded Master of the Choristers is Richard Martyn in the 1550s. The role of "Organist" has been combined with that of "Master of the Choristers" since 1801 – the first Organist and Master of the Choristers was James Target. Since the 1870s there has been an official appointment of an "Assistant Organist".

Several well-known composers, including Thomas Weelkes and John Reading, have served as cathedral organist. Anne Maddocks (Assistant Organist, 1942–49) was the first woman in the country to hold such a post in a cathedral, and Sarah Baldock (Organist and Master of the Choristers, 2008–14) was the second woman, after Katherine Dienes at Guildford Cathedral, to hold the most senior musical post in a Church of England cathedral.

Organs

Main Organ

The earliest organs in the cathedral were destroyed by the forces of Colonel Waller during the period of the Commonwealth. Following the Restoration of the Monarchy, Renatus Harris built a one-manual organ on the screen in 1678; the pipes of the organ still form the heart of the present instrument. In 1725, John Byfield added the Choir Organ and Thomas Knight added the third keyboard, the swell, in 1778. Further additions were made in the 19th century by George Pike England (1806) Henry Pilcher & Sons (1829) before, in 1859, the great Victorian organ builder William Hill was employed to move the organ from the screen to its present position. The collapse of the tower and spire in 1861 left the organ a mid-19th century instrument, as all the money that could be raised at the time was spent on the building and furnishings rather than on the organ. The organ was restored further by Hele of Plymouth in 1904, but neglect dictated by financial constraints meant that in 1972 its working mechanism was in such a parlous state that the organ had to be abandoned as unplayable. After a silence of fourteen years it was eventually restored by Mander in 1984–86. Today it is widely regarded as a very special part of the heritage of English organs and it is the only surviving example of an English classical, rather than romantic, cathedral instrument.

Nave Organ
Source: Details of the Nave Organ from the National Pipe Organ Register

The Nave Organ was a gift of the Poling Charitable Trust, the Nave Organ was built by Mander as part of the organ project in 1986. With one manual of six stops, plus a single pedal stop, the Nave Organ is designed to reinforce the presence of the main organ in the nave, or for use in its own right for in the "nave-only" services. The Nave Organ can be played either from its own console downstairs, or direct from the main organ.

Walker Organ
Source: Details of the Walker Organ from the National Pipe Organ Register

The Walker Organ, built in 1980, is a continuo instrument of one manual (no pedals) containing six stops and an integral blower. It is usually housed in the Lady chapel, and accompanies services held in that part of the cathedral. It is, however, readily moveable and is frequently used for concerts of baroque music in the nave.

Hurdis Organ
Source: Details of the Hurdis Organ from the National Pipe Organ Register

The Hurdis Organ was built c.1780 at least partly by the Reverend James Hurdis, who was headmaster of the Prebendal School who went on to be Professor of Poetry at Oxford University. In 1947, the Hurdis family gave the organ to the Prebendal School who, in turn deposited it on loan to the cathedral. It is currently housed in the retrochoir, where it is regularly used to accompany services at the Shrine of St. Richard.

Allen Organ
The Allen Organ was brought into the cathedral in 1972, at the time when the main organ was abandoned, and was used to accompany all main services until 1986 when the main organ came back into use. Thereafter, the Allen Organ was repositioned in the triforium at the west end of the cathedral as a concert organ. It is one of the earliest digital electronic organs in this country and continues to play an important part in the provision for musical events in the cathedral.

Organists
The Organist and Master of the Choristers is responsible for overseeing the music of the cathedral, including the training and direction of the cathedral choir. The Assistant Organist accompanies the choir and is required to deputise the responsibilities of the Organist and Master of the Choristers. Despite the title which implies that they assist an organist, the Assistant Organist spends the most time at the organ console. In common with nearly all cathedrals in the UK, Chichester appoints an organ scholar each year to take a share of the playing of services in the cathedral and the training of the probationers in the Prebendal School. The organ scholarship is a one-year non-renewable post usually held by someone in their gap year between school and university, or in the first couple of years after graduation.

See also
 Chichester Cathedral
 List of musicians at English cathedrals
 Choir of Chichester Cathedral

Notes

References

Sources
 N. Plumley and J. Lees, The Organs and Organists of Chichester Cathedral (Phillimore, 1988)
 W. B. Henshaw, Biographical Dictionary of the Organ  2003–2012
 ExLibris, Early English Musick 1385–1714  1998–2008

English organists
Culture in West Sussex
Chichester Cathedral
Organists & Masters of the Choristers of Chichester Cathedral
Assistant Organists of Chichester Cathedral